The Possum Drop is any one of several New Year's Day celebrations, during which a possum is lowered from height at midnight. This practice is also referred to as a ‘coon drop’ in some countries. In contrast to other events of its kind, which typically involve replicas, a "possum drop" uses a live animal as its prop.

Brasstown Drop
The possum drop began as an annual event in Brasstown, North Carolina at a convenience store called Clay's Corner, and it was organized by proprietors Clay and Judy Logan. At midnight on New Year's Eve, instead of dropping an inanimate object, a plexiglass pyramid containing a live opossum was lowered slowly from the roof of the store in a way that would prevent the occurrence of injury. Though it is referred to as a "possum drop" the animal not physically "dropped." As with other events of its kind, it is lowered in the same manner as a time ball.

The event organizer moved the event to Andrews, North Carolina for the 2018-2019 event upon Clay and Judy Logan's retirement. After lawsuits by People for the Ethical Treatment of Animals and appeals to state officials by concerned citizens, the town opted not to continue the Possum Drop for 2020.  The Possum Drop was ended after much controversy when one of the opossums in Andrews was injured and used with a broken leg that was later amputated.  

The festivities included a contest with local men dressed as women to compete for the title "Miss Possum Queen" as well as bluegrass music, snacks and beverages, and souvenir merchandise. These celebrations, along with a rasslin' competition, will continue despite the end of the Possum Drop.

Tallapoosa Drop
In Tallapoosa, Georgia, Local businessman Danny Welch organizes the annual event. The Possum Drop festivities include food vendors, T-shirts and souvenirs, live music, and fireworks after midnight. A special Kids Drop with Fireworks is at 9 PM for the children who may not be able to stay up until the midnight drop. The Master of Ceremonies for the December 31, 2019 celebration was George Franco, a Television Personality with Fox 5 News in Atlanta. Attendance in recent years has been in excess of 7000. Shuttle Bus Service is provided to and from local hotels, RV Parks and designated parking areas. This event differs from the one in Brasstown due to the usage of a taxidermied possum rather than a live one.  It is humane and no live wild animal is tormented by fireworks.

Spencer the famous possum is suspended in a wire ball wrapped with Christmas lights and is kept at ground level most of the night to allow spectators to see and have pictures taken with him. At about 11:30 PM he is raised to the top of the Cain Law Firm Building and at midnight amidst great fanfare and cheers is slowly lowered to the ground to signify the start of the new year. A living animal is not lowered: Spencer was a real opossum found dead in the wild and was stuffed by local taxidermist Bud Jones. Spencer's name is a tribute to Ralph L. Spencer.

The event has grown over the last five years and attracts visitors from across the country who travel to Tallapoosa to celebrate New Year's Eve. The event has caught the attention of local and national media. The Learning Channel (TLC) chose The Possum Drop in Tallapoosa as the location to film the New Years Special for their series Here comes Honey Boo Boo.

Opposition
Possum drops have been subject to criticism and protest from PETA, an organization that considers the drop a form of animal cruelty. PETA successfully sued to stop the 2013 Brasstown possum drop, under the premise that the state wildlife commission did not have the authority to issue the permits for such an event. North Carolina General Statue 113-274-(c)-(1c) appears to authorize the state wildlife commission to issue such permits.  

In spite of this, the organizers used a dead opossum instead, after deciding they could not afford legal expenses that could result from defying PETA's request as they had originally planned to do. PETA did not object to using an already dead animal. The North Carolina legislature passed a law in 2013 to expressly allow the commission to issue such permits, and the Brasstown event resumed in 2014. Thousands of local residents and from all over the US signed petitions to stop this event using a live opossum.

Brasstown received more national attention for the 2015 New Year Possum Drop when PETA again filed a motion to prevent Clay Logan from obtaining a capture permit; Logan had already decided, due to time concerns, not to obtain a state permit for that year's drop.

External links
PETA Files Lawsuit to Stop Opossum Drop

References

New Year in the United States
Controversies in the United States
Animal cruelty incidents
Opossums
Appalachian culture
Clay County, North Carolina
Haralson County, Georgia